The Montalvo beach is a Galician beach located in the municipality of Sanxenxo in the province of Pontevedra, Spain. It is 1000 metres long and 80 metres width at low tide and 20 at high tide and has beautiful views over the Ria de Pontevedra.

Description 
It is a straight beach, located in a semi-rural environment. It is bordered on the left by Punta Montalvo, a natural promontory and scenic viewpoint, and on the right by Punta Paxariñas, which is less pronounced and separates Montalvo beach from Paxariñas beach.

The fine white sand forms very gently sloping dunes with sparse vegetation that separate the beach from the nearby pine forest. It is a wide, windy beach with moderate waves, which has an area for mooring boats.

Access 
From Sanxenxo, on the PO-308 road to O Grove, in Montalvo, take a left turn towards the beach.

Gallery

See also 
 Sanxenxo
 Ria de Pontevedra
 Rias Baixas
 La Lanzada Beach

References

Tourism in Galicia (Spain)
Province of Pontevedra
Beaches of Spain
Beaches of Galicia (Spain)
Tourist attractions in Galicia (Spain)
Pontevedra